Sarah Jane Morris may refer to:

 Sarah Jane Morris (singer) (born 1959), English singer
 Sarah Jane Morris (actress) (born 1977), American actress

See also
Sarah Morris (disambiguation)